The Kurdish Red Crescent is a humanitarian nonprofit organisation operating mainly in the Autonomous Administration of North and East Syria. It is the primary provider of medical care and aid for refugees who have fled from attacks by ISIL and the Syrian and Turkish governments. It has also been involved in the reconstruction of Kobanî, which was largely destroyed after months of fighting with ISIL.

Activities
The organization was founded in 1993 and currently has fundraising branches in several European countries, including Germany, Sweden and the United Kingdom where the organisation is registered as a charity. During the Siege of Kobanî, the Kurdish Red Crescent called for international medical and humanitarian aid, as well as for medical personnel to return to Kobanî to help as there has been a lack of clean water and sewage treatment in the area due to damage. In 2019, the Kurdish Red Crescent received a €250,000 donation from the German political party Die PARTEI.

In northeastern Syria, the Kurdish Red Crescent currently has branches in Kobanî, Al-Darbasiyah, Tel Tamer, Al-Hasakah, Qamishli, Amuda, Al-Qahtaniyah, Al-Malikiyah, Al-Muabbada, Sheikh Maqsood, as well as the Al-Hawl, Newroz and Roj refugee camps. There were also branches in Afrin and Ras al-Ayn before the capture of these towns by Turkey and the Turkish-backed Free Syrian Army. The Kurdish Red Crescent has six main projects for its activities in northeastern Syria: "The Children's Project", "The Sibling Family Project", "The Health Project", "The Emergency Aid Project", "The Prisoner Solidarity Project", and "The Project for Cooperation with Like-Minded Aid Organisations".

International recognition
The Kurdish Red Crescent is not currently recognized by the International Federation of Red Cross and Red Crescent Societies (IFRC). To be recognized, an organization has to be the only official aid society in an independent state that has ratified the Geneva Conventions and the Autonomous Administration of North and East Syria is not currently internationally recognized neither as an autonomous region or an independent state. In 2010, the Supervisory and Service Directorate of the State of Rhineland-Palatinate in Germany ruled that the Kurdish Red Crescent could not use the Red Crescent or the Red Cross symbols because only one state-authorized aid society in each state is permitted to use that logo and therefore the organization cannot collect donations in Rhineland-Palatinate.

There is some pragmatic cooperation on the ground between the IFRC and the Kurdish Red Crescent, as for example concerning IFRC detention visits to prisoners held by the region's authorities. Existing pragmatic cooperation between the IFRC and the  Kurdish Red Crescent were at least partially upset by the Turkish expansion into certain areas in 2019.

See also
 International Red Cross and Red Crescent Movement
 Autonomous Administration of North and East Syria 
 Movement for a Democratic Society
 Syrian Democratic Forces
 People's Protection Units

References

External links
 
 Kobanî reconstruction needs

Organizations based in Syria
Organizations established in 1993
Kurdish organisations
Red Cross and Red Crescent national societies